The mutant wrasse (Conniella apterygia), also known as Connie's wrasse, is a species of wrasse only known to occur in Australia's Rowley Shoals at depths from . This species is the only known member of its genus. This unusual wrasse lacks pelvic fins and the males have a long, pointed tail.

References

Labridae
Monotypic fish genera
Fish described in 1983
Taxa named by Gerald R. Allen